Emiliano Mutti is a geologist who has made significant contributions to petroleum geosciences, especially to sedimentary dynamics of turbidites and their reservoir characterization.

Emiliano Mutti was born in 1933 near the small lake Orta in northern Italy. During World War II his father Ido moved the family to the small mountain village of Nociveglia in the Northern Apennines. Surrounded by rocks and forests, Emiliano developed a love for the mountains that he has never lost. Later, when he realized that the rocks in this valley were turbidites, he returned to study them and produce classic papers on deep-water depositional systems.

Emiliano completed a master's degree in geology at the University of Milan in 1959. His thesis was on the stratigraphy and structure of Tertiary Macigno turbidites in the Northern Apennines. From 1960 to 1965, Emiliano was assistant professor of sedimentology at the University of Milan.

In 1965, interest in research led him to accept a job with the Esso Production Research Lab in Bordeaux, the European affiliate of Exxon Production Research Company in Houston. Through this connection, Emiliano met Chuck Campbell, and the two of them did field work in Italy.

After several weeks, Chuck invited Emiliano to the United States for additional training. The time spent with Chuck was a turning point in Emiliano's career. He describes the experience this way: "At that time I had a lot of experience in field mapping and knew turbidites quite well. Chuck realized that I didn't know anything else. He took me into the field in the States and taught me how to recognize fluvial and shallow- marine. Most importantly he taught me his stratigraphic approach" In 1969, Emiliano resigned from Esso to become a professor at the University of Torino. In 1971 he received his PhD and in 1975 he became a full professor. In 19sn Emiliano moved to the University of Parma where he was a full professor of sedimentary geology. Now he is retired.

During his career Emiliano has mainly worked on stratigraphy and sedimentology of turbidite basins in fold-thrust belts, notably in the Spanish Pyrenees, the northern Apennines, and Greece. Much of his work is summarized in classic papers co-authored with Franco Ricci Lucchi, and Bill Normark. Since 1989 his work has focused on stratigraphy and facies analysis of flood-dominated fluvio-deltaic deposits and their relationships to turbidite systems in many tectonically mobile basins worldwide.

Emiliano is a field geologist with a very strong passion for sedimentary rocks. Anyone who has been in the field with him knows that he is a master of observation and description. He always carries a sketchpad in the field; his sketches of outcrops are extraordinary for their detail and ability to sort out complex sedimentary relationships. All of his papers are characterized by superb photographs, which are the result for his love of photography. Emiliano has received numerous awards and honorary memberships in geological societies.

He has written over 100 scientific papers and several books on stratigraphy and turbidite systems. Professor Emiliano Mutti coached several geologists, mainly from Brazilian oil company Petrobras in various activities in the regions of the Spanish Pyrenees and the northern Apennines in Italy.

In 2004, E. Mutti won the Twenhofel Medal from SEPM (Society for Sedimentary Geology), which is the highest medal of recognition to a career of excellence in sedimentary geology.

Selected publications
E. Mutti, R. Tinterri, E. Remacha, N. Mavilla, S. Angella and L. Fava An Introduction to the Analysis of Ancient Turbidite Basins from an Outcrop Perspective, 1999, American Association of Petroleum Geologists

E. Mutti & G. Davoli, Turbidite Sandstones, 1992 - AGIP, Istituto di geologia, Università di Parma

E. Mutti, F.R. Lucchi, Turbidites of the Northern Apennines: Introduction to Facies Analysis,  1978, American Geological Institute

https://web.archive.org/web/20120201153300/http://www.sepmstrata.org/Deepwater/DeepwaterClasticSedStruct.html including a picture of Dr Mutti

See also
Video-interview with Prof. Mutti in www.minigeology.com: "Dreaming about turbidites"

Twenhofel Medal

References

1933 births
Academic staff of the University of Parma
21st-century Italian geologists
Living people
20th-century Italian geologists